Conchita Martínez and Barbara Paulus won in the final 1–6, 6–1, 6–4 against Sabrina Goleš and Katerina Maleeva.

Seeds
Champion seeds are indicated in bold text while text in italics indicates the round in which those seeds were eliminated.

 Sabrina Goleš /  Katerina Maleeva (final)
 Andrea Betzner /  Emilse Raponi-Longo (semifinals)
 Iva Budařová /  Sandra Wasserman (semifinals)
 Ann Devries /  Julie Salmon (first round)

Draw

References
 1988 Vitosha New Otani Open Doubles Draw

Vitosha New Otani Open
1988 WTA Tour